This is a bibliography of major works on the History of Canada.

Scholarly journals focused on Canadian history
 Acadiensis, covers Atlantic Canada
 Alberta history
 American Review of Canadian Studies
 British Columbia History
 Canada's History, Formerly The Beaver (1920–2010)
 Canadian Historical Review, the major scholarly journal
 Histoire sociale/Social History, focus on Canada
 Labour/Le Travail
 London Journal of Canadian Studies
 Manitoba History
 Ontario History
 Revue d'histoire de l'Amérique française focus on Quebec
 Saskatchewan History
 Urban History Review - Revue d'histoire urbaine

Atlases, geography, environment
 
 
 
 
 
 
 
 
 
 
 
  Historiography
  on human uses and control of fires

Surveys (overviews)
  Recommended place to start
  Web listing of Canadian history sources
 
 
 
 
 
 
 
 
 
 
 
 
 
  1650 short entries

Chronicles of Canada series
 
 
 
 
 
 
 
 
  also at Archive.org
 
 
 
 
 
 
 
 
 
 
 
 
 
 
 
 
 
 
 
 
 
 
 

Republished

Provinces and territories

Cities

Indigenous
 
  online 
 
 X

Prior to 1763
  thousands of scholarly biographies of those who died by 1930
 Bannister, Jerry. "Atlantic Canada in an Atlantic World? Northeastern North America in the Long 18th Century." Acadiensis 43.2 (2014) online.

 
 
 
 
  University textbook
 
 
 
 
 
 
 
 
 
 
 
 
 
 
 Marshall, Bill, ed. France and the Americas: Culture, Politics, and History (3 Vol 2005)

1763–1867

 , thousands of scholarly biographies of those who died by 1930
 
  
 
 
 
  influential scholarly biography

Primary sources

1867–1920
 
 
 
 
  the standard survey
 
  Influential scholarly biography
 
 
 
 
 
 
 
  -
 
 
 
 
 
  standard history

First World War homefront
 
 
 
 
 
 
 
 
 
 
 
 
 
 
 
 
  First World War
  16 essays by leading scholars
 
 
 Millman, Brock. Polarity, Patriotism, and Dissent in Great War Canada, 1914–1919 (University of Toronto Press, 2016).
 
 
 
 
 
 
 
 
 
 
  looks at farmers near Lethbridge, Alberta, shopkeepers in Guelph, Ontario, and civic workers in Trois-Rivières, Québec

Historiography and memory
 ; historiography
 ; bibliography
 ; cultural history

1921–1957

Overviews
 
 
 
 
  
 Creighton, Donald. The Forked Road: Canada 1939–1957 (McClelland and Stewart Limited, 1976), general survey.
 
 
  standard scholarly survey

Politics
 
 
 
  -
 
 
  standard biography
  
  A primary source

Great Depression
  -
 
  well-written popular history
  Primary sources
 
 
 
  describes life in Winnipeg during the depression
  includes recollections of the 1930s
  sociological study
 
 
  DAI 2003 63(7): 2644-2645-A. DANQ70191  Fulltext in ProQuest Dissertations & Theses
 
  standard economic history; has data on public and private investment in the major sectors of the economy
  with articles on Aberhart, George McCullagh, Pattullo and the Reconstruction Party.

Second World War
 
 
 
 
 
 Granatstein; J. L. The Generals: The Canadian Army's Senior Commanders in the Second World War (University of Calgary Press, 2005) online
  
 
 
 
  standard survey
  collection of more than 140,000 newspaper clippings

Cold War
 Bothwell, Robert. The Big Chill: Canada and the Cold War (Concord: Irwin Publishing, 1998).
 Campbell, Isabel. Unlikely Diplomats: The Canadian Brigade in Germany, 1951-64 (UBC Press, 2013).
 Chapnick, Adam. The Middle Power Project: Canada and the Forming of the United Nations (UBC Press, 2005).
 
 Eayrs, James. In Defence of Canada: Peacemaking and Deterrence (U of Toronto Press, 1972).
 English, John. The Worldly Years: The Life of Lester Pearson, Volume II: 1949–1972 (Vintage Books Canada, 1993).
 Holmes, John W. The Shaping of Peace: Canada and the Search for World Order 1943–1957 (2 vol. U of Toronto Press, 1979–82).
 Pearson, Geoffrey. Seize the Day: Lester B. Pearson and Crisis Diplomacy (Carleton UP, 1993).
 Smith, Denis. Diplomacy of Fear: Canada and the Cold War, 1941–1948 (U of Toronto Press, 1988).
 Teigrob, Robert. Warming up to the Cold War: Canada and the United States' coalition of the willing, from Hiroshima to Korea (U of Toronto Press, 2009.
 Thompson, John Herd and Stephen J. Randall. Canada and the United States: Ambivalent Allies (University of Georgia Press, 1994).
 Whitaker, Reginald, and Gary Marcuse. Cold War Canada: The making of a national insecurity state, 1945–1957 (U of Toronto Press, 1994).

Since 1957
Overviews
 
 
 
 
 
 
 

Specific

Contemporary

Military history

 
 
 
 
 
 
 
 
 
 Granatstein, J.L. and Dean F. Oliver. (2010). The Oxford companion to Canadian military history. (Toronto: Oxford University Press).
  historiography
 Granatstein; J.L. The Generals: The Canadian Army's Senior Commanders in the Second World War (University of Calgary Press, 2005).
 
 Granatstein, J.L.  and David Bercuson. War and Peacekeeping: From South Africa to the Gulf- Canada's Limited Wars (Toronto: Key Porter Books, 1991).
 Granatstein, J.L. and David Stafford. Spy Wars: Espionage and Canada from Gouzenko to Glasnost (Key Porter Books, 1990).
 Grey, Jeffrey. The Commonwealth Armies and the Korean War: An Alliance Study (Manchester UP, 1988).
 Harris, Stephen. (1988). Canadian Brass: The making of a professional army, 1860–1939 (Toronto:  U. of Toronto Press).
 Horn, Bernd and Stephen Harris, eds. (2001). Warrior chiefs: Perspectives on senior Canadian military leaders. (Toronto: Dundurn Press).
 Humphries, Mark Osborne, ed. (2008). The selected papers of Sir Arthur Currie: Diaries, letters, and report to the Ministry, (1917–1933. (Waterloo:  Wilfrid Laurier University Press).
 Kasurak, Peter. A National Force: The Evolution of Canada's Army, 1950–2000 (Vancouver: UBC Press, 2013).
 Maloney, Sean. Canada and UN Peacekeeping: Cold War by Other Means (St. Catherines: Vanwell Publishing, 2002).
 Maloney, Sean. Learning to Love the Bomb: Canada's Nuclear Weapons During the Cold War (Potomac Books, Inc., 2007).
 Melady, John. Korea: Canada's Forgotten War (Macmillan of Canada, 1983).
 Meyers, Edward C. Thunder in the Morning Calm: The Royal Canadian Navy in Korea: 1950–1955. (St. Catherines: Vanwell, 1992)
 Milner, Marc. Canadian military history. (Toronto: Copp Clark Putnam, 1993).
 Milner, Marc. Canada's navy: The first century. 2nd edition. (University of Toronto Press, 2010).
 Morton, Desmond. A Military History of Canada: From Champlain to the Gulf War (McClellan and Stewart Inc., 1992).
 Morton, Desmond. (1981). Canada and war: A military and political history. Toronto: Butterworths
 Nicholson, Gerald W. L. The fighting Newfoundlanders: A history of the Royal Newfoundland Regiment. (2nd ed. McGill-Queen's University Press, 2006,).
 
 Rickard, John. Politics of Command: Lieutenant-General A.G.L. McNaughton and the Canadian Army, 1939–1943 (2009)
 Stanley, George F.G.  Canada's soldiers: The military history of an unmilitary people.  (Toronto: Macmillan, 1974)

First World War
 
 
 
 Dancocks, Daniel G. (1985). Sir Arthur Currie: A biography. (Toronto: Methuen)
 Dancocks, Daniel G. (1986). Legacy of Valour: The Canadians at Passchendaele. (Edmonton: Hurtig Publishers).
 Dancocks, Daniel G. (1988). Welcome to Flanders Fields, the first Canadian battle of the Great War: Ypres, 1915. (Toronto: McClelland & Stewart.
 Duguid, A.F. (1938). Official history of the Canadian forces in the Great War, 1914–1919. Vol. 1. (Ottawa: King's Printer.
 Evans Shaw, Susan. (2011). Canadians at war: A guide to the battlefields of World War I. (Fredericton: Goose Lane Editions)
 Freeman, Bill and Richard Nielson. (1999). Far from home: Canadians in the First World War. (Toronto: McGraw-Hill Ryerson)
 Granatstein, J.L. (2004). Hell's corner: An illustrated history of Canada's Great War 1914–1918. Vancouver/(Toronto: Douglas and McIntyre)
 Gray, David. (2012). "Carrying Canadian troops: The story of RMS Olympic as a First World War troopship," Canadian Military History, Vol. 11(1), 54-70.
 Hadley, Michael L. and Roger Sarty. (1991). Tin-pots and pirate ships: Canadian naval forces and German sea raiders, 1880–1918. (Montreal and Kingston: McGill-Queen's University Press).
 Haycock, Ronald G. (1986). Sam Hughes: The public career of a controversial Canadian, 1885–1916. (Wilfrid Laurier University Press).
 Hayes, Geoffrey, Andrew Iarocci and Mike Bechthold. eds. (2007). Vimy Ridge: A Canadian reassessment. (Waterloo: Wilfrid Laurier University Press).
 
 Hyatt, A.M.J. (1987). General Sir Arthur Currie: A military biography (Toronto.  U. of Toronto Press).
 Iarocci, Andrew, and Mike Bechthold, eds. Vimy Ridge: A Canadian reassessment (Waterloo: Wilfrid Laurier University Press)
 Iarocci, Andrew. (2009). "On the threshold of modernity: Canadian horsepower on the Western Front, 1914–18," Journal of the Society for Army Historical Research pp 59–83.
 Mackenzie, David, ed. Canada and the First World War (2005); 16 specialized essays by scholars
 Macphail, Andrew. (1925). Official history of the Canadian forces in the Great War, 1914–19. The Medical Services, ((Ottawa: King's Printer)
 Morton, Desmond. (1979). "Junior but sovereign allies': The transformation of the Canadian Expeditionary Force, 1914–1918," Journal of Imperial and Commonwealth History 8#1 pp: 56-67.
 Morton, Desmond. (1992). Silent battle: Canadian prisoners of war in Germany, 1914–1919. (Toronto: Lester Publishing.
 Morton, Desmond. (1993). When your number's up: The Canadian soldier in the First World War. (Toronto: Random House of Canada)
 Morton, Desmond. (2007). A military history of Canada. (Toronto: McClelland & Stewart).
 Morton, Desmond and J.L. Granatstein. (1989). Marching to Armageddon: Canadians and the Great War 1914–1919. (Toronto: Lester & Orpen Dennys)
 Tennyson, Brian Douglas. Canada's Great War, 1914–1918: How Canada Helped Save the British Empire and Became a North American Nation (2014).
  - Total pages: 771 (Also published in French under the title: Les aviateurs canadiens dans la Première Guerre mondiale)

Official histories

First World War

Second World War

Korea

Economic history

General
 List of Economic Surveys of Canada 1961-present - by the  Organisation for Economic Co-operation and Development
 Baldwin, John R.,  and Petr Hanel.  Innovation and Knowledge Creation in an Open Economy: Canadian Industry and International Implications (2007)
 Berton,  Pierre. The Great Depression: 1929–1939 (1990) is a popular account
 Burton, F. W. "Wheat in Canadian History," The Canadian Journal of Economics and Political Science Vol. 3, No. 2 (May, 1937), pp. 210–217
 
 Glazebrook, G. P. de T.  A History of Transportation in Canada (1938)
 Innis, Harold. A., and A. R. M. Lower; Select Documents in Canadian Economic History, 1783–1885  University of Toronto Press, 1933, primary sources
 Mackintosh, W.A. "The Laurentian Plateau in Canadian Economic Development," Economic Geography, Vol. 2, No. 4 (Oct., 1926), pp. 537–549
 Marr, William L. and Donald Patterson. Canada: An Economic History, 1980.
 Neill, Robin (1991) A history of Canadian economic thought, Routledge
 Norrie, Kenneth, Douglas Owram, and J.C. Herbert Emery. A History of the Canadian Economy 4th ed. (2007)
 Russell, Peter A. Farming in the Nineteenth Century (2012), 400pp; covers Ontario, Quebec and Manitoba
 Sandwell, R. W. "Notes toward a history of rural Canada, 1870-1940." in Social Transformation in Rural Canada: Community, Cultures, and Collective Action (2013): 21-42.

Business history
 Bliss, Michael.  Northern Enterprise: Five Centuries of Canadian Business. McClelland and Stewart, (1987).
 Bordo, Michael D., Angela Redish, and Hugh Rockoff. Economic History Review 68#1 (2015): 218–43
 Fleming, Keith R.  Power at Cost: Ontario Hydro and Rural Electrification, 1911–1958. McGill-Queen's U. Press, (1992). 326 pp.
 Frost, James D.  Merchant princes: Halifax's first family of finance, ships, and steel (2003)
 Klassen, Henry C. A Business History of Alberta (1999) 362 pp.
 Kottman, Richard N. "Herbert Hoover and the Smoot–Hawley Tariff: Canada, A Case Study", Journal of American History (1975), 62#3 pp 609–635 in JSTOR
 Laxer, Gordon. Open for Business: The Roots of Foreign Ownership in Canada. (Toronto: Oxford University Press, 1989).
 Lingenfelter, Richard E., ed.  The Mining West: A Bibliography & Guide to the History & Literature of Mining in the American & Canadian West. 2 vol Scarecrow, 2003. 1550 pp
 McDonald, Judith; O'Brien, Anthony Patrick; Callahan, Colleen. "Trade Wars: Canada's Reaction to the Smoot–Hawley Tariff", Journal of Economic History (1997), 57#4 pp 802–826, in JSTOR
 Myers, Gustavus (1972), A history of Canadian wealth,  Lewis and Samuel online, on the super-rich
 Naylor, Tom. The History of Canadian Business. 1867–1914 2 vol (1976)
 Porter, John. "Concentration of Economic Power and the Economic Elite in Canada," The Canadian Journal of Economics and Political Science, Vol. 22, No. 2 (May, 1956), pp. 199–220
 Roberts, David.  In the Shadow of Detroit: Gordon M. McGregor, Ford of Canada, and Motoropolis. Wayne State U. Press, 2006. 320 pp.
 Santink, Joy L.  Timothy Eaton and the Rise of His Department Store. U. of Toronto Press, 1990. 319 pp.
 Taylor, Graham D. and Peter Baskerville. A Concise History of Business in Canada (1994)
  Watts, George. The Bank of Canada: Origins and Early History (Carleton University Press, 1993)
 Williams, Glen. Not for Export: The International Competitiveness of Canadian Manufacturing. Toronto: McClelland and Stewart, 3rd edition, 1994.

Natural resources, energy, oil, lumber
 
 Desbiens, Caroline. Power from the North: Territory, Identity, and the Culture of Hydroelectricity in Quebec (2014)
 
 Froschauer, Karl.  White gold: Hydroelectric Power in Canada. Vancouver: UBC Press, 1999. excerpt and text search
 Gillis,  Robert Peter. "The Ottawa lumber barons and the conservation movement 1880–1914." Journal of Canadian Studies 9#1 (1974): 14-30. online
 Le Riche, Timothy.  Alberta's Oil Patch - The People, Politics & Companies (2006)
 
 Lower,  A.R.M. The North American Assault on the Canadian Forest (1938).

Labour and working class
 Abella, Irving M.   On strike; six key labour struggles in Canada, 1919–1949 (James, Lewis & Samuel 1974) 
 Babcock, Robert H. Gompers in Canada: a study in American continentalism before the First World War (1974) online at ACLS e-books
 Bradbury, Bettina. Working families: Age, gender, and daily survival in industrializing Montreal (1993)
 Craig Heron. The Canadian Labour Movement: A Brief History, 1996.
 Craven, Paul, ed., Labouring lives: work and workers in nineteenth-century Ontario (1995)
 Davis, Angela E. (1995)  Art and work: a social history of labour in the  Canadian graphic arts industry to the 1940s McGill-Queen's University Press 
 Frager, Ruth A.,  and Carmela K. Patrias, eds.  Discounted Labour: Women Workers in Canada, 1870–1939 (2005) online
 Forsey, Eugene Alfred. Trade unions in Canada, 1812–1902 (1982).
 Frank, David. J. B. McLachlan: A Biography: The Story of a Legendary Labour Leader and the Cape Breton Coal Miners (1999)
 Haddow, Rodney, and Thomas Klassen. Partisanship, Globalization, and Canadian Labour Market Policy: Four Provinces in Comparative Perspective (2006)
 Heron, Craig. The Canadian Labour Movement: A Brief History, (1996).
 Hertel; D. W. History of the Brotherhood of Maintenance of Way Employees: Its Birth and Growth, 1887–1955 . (1955)
 Horowitz, Gad. Canadian Labour in Politics (1968), Covers 1930–1965
 Jamieson, Stuart. Times of Trouble: Labour Unrest and Industrial Conflict in Canada, 1900–1966 (1968), Detailed coverage of strikes
 
 Kealey, Gregory S.  Dreaming of what might be: the Knights of Labor in Ontario, 1880–1900 (1982)  excerpt and text search
 Kealey, Greg. "Writing about Labour" in Schultz, ed. Writing About Canada: A Handbook for Modern Canadian History (1990), pp 145–74
 Lipton, Charles. The Trade Union Movement in Canada 1827–1959 (1966), a standard history from a Marxist perspective
 Logan, Harold. Trade Unions in Canada (1948), large amount of factual information
 MacEwan, Paul. Miners and Steelworkers: Labour in Cape Breton (1976)
 Morton, Desmond.  Working People: An Illustrated History of the Canadian Labour Movement (1999)
 Ogmundson, Richard, and Michael Doyle. "The rise and decline of Canadian Labour/1960 to 2000: Elites, power, ethnicity and gender." Canadian Journal of Sociology/Cahiers canadiens de sociologie (2002): 413-454.
 Palmer, Bryan D. Working Class Experience: Rethinking the History of Canadian Labour, 1800–1991 (1992)
 Robin, Martin. Radical Politics and Labour in Canada (1968), left-wing politics 1880–1930

Historiography
 Abella, Irving M. "Labour and working-class history" in * Granatstein and Stevens, eds. A Reader's Guide to Canadian History: Confederation to the Present (1982) pp 114–36.
 Kealey, Gregory S. "Labour and working-class history in Canada: Prospects in the 1980s." Labour/Le Travail (1981): 67-94.
 Morton, Desmond. "Some millennial reflections on the state of Canadian labour history." Labour/Le Travail (2000): 11-36. online
 Palmer, Bryan D. "Working-Class Canada: Recent Historical Writing." Queen's Quarterly 86.4 (1979): 594+
 Vaisey, G. Douglas (1980) The Labour Companion: A Bibliography Of Canadian Labour History Based On Materials Printed From 1950 To 1975, James Lorimer & Company

Railways
 Andreae, Christopher. Lines of Country: An Atlas of Railway and Waterway History in Canada (1996)
 
 
 
 Berton Pierre.  The Last Spike: The Great Railway, 1881–1885 (2001) excerpt and text search, popular history
  Brown, Ron.  The Train Doesn't Stop Here Any More (1998) an illustrated history of railway stations in Canada
 Currie, A. W.  The Grand Trunk Railway of Canada. University of Toronto Press, 1957. 556 pp, the standard history
 
 Fleming, R. B.  The Railway King of Canada: Sir William Mackenzie, 1849–1923 University of British Columbia Press, 1991
 Fournier, Leslie T.  Railway Nationalization in Canada: The Problem of the Canadian National Railways (1937)
 
 Freeman, Kenneth D. et al. The Growth and Performance of the Canadian Transcontinental Railways 1956–1981 (1987)
 Hertel; D. W. History of the Brotherhood of Maintenance of Way Employees: Its Birth and Growth, 1887–1955 (1955)  online 
 Hofsommer, Don L. Grand Trunk Corporation: Canadian National Railways in the United States, 1971–1992. 1995. 227 pp. online
 Kaye, Lamb W. History of the Canadian Pacific Railway. (1977).
 
 Leonard, Frank. A Thousand Blunders: The Grand Trunk Pacific Railway and Northern British Columbia University of British Columbia Press, 1996
 
 
 den Otter, A.A. The Philosophy of Railways: The Transcontinental Railway Idea in British North America University of Toronto Press, 1997.
 
 Regehr, T. D. The Canadian Northern Railway Macmillan of Canada 1976
 
 Stevens, G. History of the Canadian National Railways Macmillan Company 1973
 
 
 Weaver, R. Kent. The Politics of Industrial Change: Railway Policy in North America  (1985)
 Willson, Beckles. The Life of Lord Strathcona and Mount Royal  1915.

Technology

Political and legal
 Argyle, Ray. Turning Points: The Campaigns That Changed Canada - 2011 and Before (2011) excerpt and text search, ch 5
 Auger, Michel; Edwards, Peter (2004), The encyclopedia of Canadian organized crime: from Captain Kidd to Mom Boucher, Marks & Spencer 
 Cook, Ramsay, ed. French-Canadian Nationalism; An Anthology (Macmillan of Canada,  1969).
 Courtney, John C; David E. Smith. The Oxford handbook of Canadian politics (Oxford University Press, 2010)
 Craik, Neil et al., eds. Public Law: Cases, materials, and commentary (Toronto: Emond Montgomery Publications, 2006). 
 Dyck, Rand. Canadian Politics, Concise Fifth Edition (Cengage Learning, 2011)
 Fierlbeck, Katherine. Political Thought in Canada: An Intellectual History, Broadview Press, 2006
 Greene, Ian The Charter of Rights (1989), James Lorimer and Company, 
 Jones, Richard.  Community in crisis : French-Canadian nationalism in perspective (McClelland and Stewart, 1967).
 McKay, Ian.  Rebels, Reds, Radicals: Rethinking Canada's Left History, Between the Lines, 2006.
 Mann, Susan. Action Française: French Canadian nationalism in the twenties (University of Toronto Press,  1975).
 Monet, Jacques. The Last Cannon Shot; A Study of French-Canadian Nationalism, 1837–1850 (University of Toronto Press,  1969).
 Morton, Frederick Lee. Law, politics, and the judicial process in Canada (University of Calgary Press, 2002).
 Schneider, Stephen. Iced: The Story of Organized Crime in Canada (Wiley, 2009)

British roles
 Buckner, Phillip Alfred. The transition to responsible government: British policy in British North America, 1815–1850 (1985).
 Jasanoff, Maya. Liberty’s Exiles: The Loss of America and the Remaking of the British Empire (2011).
 Kaufman, Will, and Heidi Slettedahl Macpherson, eds. Britain and the Americas: Culture, Politics, and History (3 vol 2005), 1157pp; encyclopedic coverage.
 Lyon, Peter. Britain and Canada: Survey of a Changing Relationship (1976)
 Martin, Ged. "Attacking the Durham Myth: Seventeen Years On." Journal of Canadian Studies 25.1 (1990): 39-59.
 Martin, Ged. Britain and the Origins of Canadian Confederation, 1837-67 (2001).
 Messamore, Barbara Jane. Canada's Governors General, 1847–1878: Biography and Constitutional Evolution (U of Toronto Press, 2006).
 Smith, Andrew. "Patriotism, self-interest and the ‘Empire effect’: Britishness and British decisions to invest in Canada, 1867–1914." Journal of Imperial and Commonwealth History 41.1 (2013): 59-80.

Cultural history, popular culture
 
 Blair, Jennifer; (2005)  ReCalling Early Canada: Reading the Political in Literary and Cultural Production. U. of Alberta Press
 Clarke, George Elliott.   Odysseys Home: Mapping African-Canadian Literature. U. of Toronto Press, 2002. 491 pp.
 
  2001 ed. ; 2010 ed. .
 Druick, Zoë.  Aspa Kotsopoulos (2008) Programming reality: perspectives on English-Canadian television, Wilfrid Laurier University Press 
 Feldman, Seth and Nelson, Joyce, ed.  Canadian Film Reader. Toronto: Martin, 1977. 405 pp.
 Francis, Daniel.  The Imaginary Indian: The Image of the Indian in Canadian Culture. Vancouver: Arsenal Pulp, 1992. 260 pp.
 Hammill, Faye.   Literary Culture and Female Authorship in Canada 1760–2000. Amsterdam: Rodopi, 2003. 245 pp.
 Keith, W. J.   Canadian Literature in English. London: Longman, 1985. 287 pp.
 Kesterton, W.H. A History of Journalism in Canada (1979)
 Lerner, Loren R. and Williamson, Mary F., eds. Art and Architecture in Canada: A Bibliography and Guide to the Literature = Art et Architecture au Canada: Bibliographie et Guide de la Documentation U. of Toronto Press, 1991. 998 pp.
 MacDonald, Mary Lu.  Literature and Society in the Canadas, 1817–1850. Mellen, 1992. 360 pp.
 Marshall, Bill, ed. France and the Americas: Culture, Politics, and History (3 Vol 2005)
 Melnyk, George.  One Hundred Years of Canadian Cinema. U. of Toronto Press, 2004. 361 pp.
 Morris,Peter (1978). Embattled shadows: a history of Canadian cinema, 1895–1939, McGill-Queen's University Press, 
 New, W. H., ed.  Literary History of Canada: Canadian Literature in English. (1990). 492 pp.
 Ord, Douglas.  The National Gallery of Canada: Ideas, Art, Architecture. (2003). 500 pp.
 Perron, Paul.   Narratology and Text: Subjectivity and Identity in New France and Québécois Literature. (2003). 338 pp.
 Simpson-Housley, Paul and Norcliffe, Glen, ed.  Few Acres of Snow: Literary and Artistic Images of Canada. (1992). 277 pp.
 Stich, K. P., ed.  Reflections: Autobiography and Canadian Literature. (1988). 176 pp.
 Smith, Judith E.  Visions of Belonging: Family Stories, Popular Culture, and Postwar Democracy, 1940–1960. (2004). 444 pp.
 Thom, Ian, and Alan Elder. A Modern Life: Art and Design in British Columbia 1945–1960 (2004)
 Toye, William, ed.  The Oxford Companion to Canadian Literature. (1983). 843 pp.
 Weiss, Jonathan, and Jane Moss. French-Canadian Literature (1996)
 Wise, Wyndham, ed. Essential guide to Canadian film. 2001

Education

 Axelrod, Paul. The Promise of Schooling: Education in Canada, 1800–1914 (1997)
 Bruno-Jofré, Rosa. "History of education in Canada: historiographic 'turns' and widening horizons." Paedagogica Historica (2014), 50#6, pp 774–785
 Burke, Sara Z., and Patrice Milewski, eds. Schooling in Transition: Readings in Canadian History of Education (2012) 24 articles by experts
 Clark, Lovell. ed The Manitoba School Question: majority rule or minority rights? (1968) historians debate the battle over French language schools
 Di Mascio, Anthony. The Idea of Popular Schooling in Upper Canada: Print Culture, Public Discourse, and the Demand for Education (McGill-Queen's University Press; 2012) 248 pages; building a common system of schooling in the late-18th and early 19th centuries.
 Gidney, R.D. and W.P.J. Millar. How Schools Worked: Public Education in English Canada, 1900–1940 (2011) 552pp; additional details
 Harris, Robin S. A history of higher education in Canada, 1663–1960 (1976) in ERIC
 Shook, Laurence K. Catholic Post-Secondary Education in English-Speaking Canada: A History (University of Toronto Press, 1971).

Sports

 Barclay, James A. Golf in Canada: A History (1992)
 Bouchier, Nancy.  For the love of the game: Amateur sport in small-town Ontario, 1838–1895 (2003)
 Boyd, Bill.  All Roads Lead to Hockey: Reports from Northern Canada to the Mexican Border. (2006). 240 pp
 Brown, D., 'The Northern Character Theme and Sport in Nineteenth Century Canada',  Canadian Journal of History of Sport, 1989, 20(1), 47-56.
 Burstyn, V.  The Rites of Men: Manhood, Politics, and The Culture of Sport.  (1999).
 Charters, David A. The Chequered Past: Sports Car Racing and Rallying in Canada, 1951 - 1991 (2007) excerpt and text search
 Coakley, Jay and Peter Donnelly, Sports in Society: Issues and Controversies, (2003), 576pp
 Dauphinais, Paul R., 'A Class Act: French-Canadians in Organized Sport,  1840–1910', International Journal of the History of Sport, 1992 7(3): 432-442.
 
 Howell, Colin D. Blood, Sweat, and Cheers: Sport and the Making of Modern Canada (2001).
 Morrow, Don, and Kevin Wamsley. Sport in Canada: A History. (2nd ed. 2009) 392 pp.
 Robidoux, Michael A. (2002)  "Imagining a Canadian Identity Through Sport: A Historical Interpretation of Lacrosse and Hockey," Journal of American Folklore, 115/456

Social
 Friedland, Martin L. University of Toronto: A History. (2002). 777pp 
 Humphries, Mark Osborne. The Last Plague: Spanish Influenza and the Politics of Public Health in Canada (University of Toronto Press; 2013) examines  the public-policy impact of the 1918 epidemic, which killed 50,000 Canadians.

Ethnicity and immigration
 Akenson, Donald H.   The Irish in Ontario: A Study in Rural History (McGill-Queen's University Press, 1984)
 Bloemraad, Irene.  Becoming a Citizen: Incorporating Immigrants and Refugees in the United States and Canada (2006)
 Campey, Lucille H. Ignored But Not Forgotten: Canada's English Immigrants (Dundurn, 2014)
 
 Campey, Lucille H. After the Hector: The Scottish Pioneers of Nova Scotia and Cape Breton, 1773–1852 (Dundurn, 2007)
 Campey, Lucille H. Les Écossais: The Pioneer Scots of Lower Canada, 1763–1855 (Dundurn, 2006)
 Campey, Lucille H. With Axe and Bible: The Scottish Pioneers of New Brunswick, 1784–1874 (Dundurn, 2007)
 Campey, Lucille H. Planters, Paupers, and Pioneers: English Settlers in Atlantic Canada (2010)
 Campey, Lucille H. Seeking a Better Future: The English Pioneers of Ontario and Quebec (2012)
 Grekul, Lisa. Leaving Shadows: Literature in English by Canada's Ukrainians (2005)
 Grenke, Arthur. The German Community in Winnipeg 1872 to 1919 (1991)
 
 Hoerder, Dirk. Creating Societies: Immigrant Lives in Canada. (2000) 416 pp.
  Iacovetta, Franca, Paula Draper, and Robert A. Ventresca. A Nation of Immigrants: Readings in Canadian History, 1840s–1960s (1998)
 Kelley, Ninette,  and Michael J. Trebilcock.  The Making of the Mosaic: A History of Canadian Immigration Policy (1998)
 Kukushkin, Vadim.  From Peasants to Labourers: Ukrainian and Belarusan Immigration from the Russian Empire to Canada (2007)
 McDougall, Duncan M. "Immigration into Canada, 1851–1920," The Canadian Journal of Economics and Political Science, Vol. 27, No. 2 (May, 1961), pp. 162–175 in JSTOR
 McKay, Ian. "Tartanism Triumphant. The Construction of Scottishness in Nova Scotia, 1933–1954." Acadiensis 21, no. 2 (Spring 1992): 5-47.
 Magocsi, Paul R. ed. Encyclopedia of Canadas Peoples (1999), detailed guides to all groups
 Makabe, Tomoko. The Canadian Sansei (1998), 3rd generation of Japanese descent
 Messamore, Barbara, ed.  Canadian Migration Patterns from Britain and North America (2004) 300pp; essays by scholars
 Petryshyn, Jaroslav.  Peasants in the Promised Land: Canada and the Ukrainians (1985)
 Pivato, Joseph.  The Anthology Of Italian-Canadian Writing (1998)
 Poy, Vivienne, ed. Passage to Promise Land: Voices of Chinese Immigrant Women to Canada (2013)  Table of Contents
 Ramirez, Bruno. On the move: French-Canadian and Italian migrants in the North Atlantic economy 1860–1914 (1991).  French-Canadians moving to New England & Italians to Montreal
 Riedel, Walter. The Old world and the new: Literary perspectives of German-speaking Canadians (1984)
 Roy, Patricia.  A White Man's Province: British Columbia Politicians and Chinese and Japanese Immigrants, 1858–1914 (1989)
 Schryer, Frans J. The Netherlandic Presence in Ontario: Pillars, Class and Dutch Ethnicity. (1998). 458 pp. focus is post WW2
 Swyripa, Frances. Storied Landscapes: Ethno-Religious Identity and the Canadian Prairies (University of Manitoba Press, 2010)  296 pp. 
 
  Wagner, Jonathan. A History Of Migration From Germany to Canada, 1850–1939 (2005)

Religion

 
 
 Bean, Lydia, Marco Gonzalez, and Jason Kaufman. "Why doesn't Canada have an American-style Christian right? A comparative framework for analyzing the political effects of evangelical subcultural identity." Canadian Journal of Sociology/Cahiers canadiens de sociologie 33.4 (2008): 899-943. online
 
 
 Carrington, Philip. The Anglican Church in Canada: A History (Collins, 1963)
 Christie,  Nancy, and Michael Gauvreau. Christian Churches and Their Peoples, 1840–1965: A Social History of Religion in Canada (2010), 176pp  excerpt and text search
 Clark, Samuel Delbert. Church and sect in Canada (U of Toronto Press, 1948.
 Clifford, N. Keith. The Resistance to Church Union in Canada, 1904–1939 (U of British Columbia Press, 1985)
 Emery, George. Methodist Church on the Prairies, 1896–1914 (McGill-Queen's Press-MQUP, 2001)
 Fay, Terence J.  A History of Canadian Catholics: Gallicanism, Romanism, and Canadianism (2002)  excerpt and text search
 Fraser, Brian J. The Social Uplifters: Presbyterian Progressives and the Social Gospel in Canada 1875–1915 (Wilfrid Laurier Univ. Press, 1988)
 Gardaz, Michel. "Religious studies in Francophone Canada." Religion 41#1 (2011): 53-70.
 Gidney, Catherine. Long Eclipse: The Liberal Protestant Establishment and the Canadian University, 1920–1970 (McGill-Queen's Press-MQUP, 2004)
 Grant, John Webster, et al. The Church in the French Era; The Church in the British Era; The Church in the Canadian Era (3 vol. 1972; 1988); general history of Catholicism and Protestantism in Canada
 Grant, John Webster. Moon of Wintertime: Missionaries and the Indians of Canada in Encounter since 1534 (U of Toronto Press, 1984)
 Healey, Robynne Rogers. From Quaker to Upper Canadian: Faith and Community Among Yonge Street Friends, 1801–1850 (McGill-Queen's Press-MQUP, 2006)
 Lahey, Raymond J. The First Thousand Years: A Brief History of the Catholic Church in Canada (2002)
 McGowan, Mark. Michael Power: The Struggle to Build the Catholic Church on the Canadian Frontier (McGill-Queen's Press-MQUP, 2005)
  Marshall, David. Secularizing the Faith: Canadian Protestant Clergy and the Crisis of Belief, 1850–1940 (1992)
 Miedema, Gary. For Canada's sake: Public religion, centennial celebrations, and the re-making of Canada in the 1960s (McGill-Queen's Press-MQUP, 2005)
 Moir, John S. Enduring witness: a history of the Presbyterian Church in Canada (3rd ed. Presbyterian Church in Canada, 1987)
 Moir, John S. Church and State in Canada, 1627–1867; Basic Documents (McClelland and Stewart, 1967), Primary sources
 
 Morice, A G. History of the Catholic Church in Western Canada: From Lake Superior to the Pacific (1659–1895) (1910) online
 Murphy, Terrence, and Gerald Stortz, eds, Creed and Culture: The Place of English-Speaking Catholics in Canadian Society, 1750 – 1930 (1993), articles by scholars
 Murphy, Terrence, and Roberto Perin, eds. A Concise History of Christianity in Canada (1996).
 , A wide-ranging general survey.
 Opp, James William. The Lord for the Body: Religion, Medicine, and Protestant Faith Healing in Canada, 1880–1930 (McGill-Queen's Press-MQUP, 2005)
 Perin, Roberto. Rome in Canada: the Vatican and Canadian affairs in the late Victorian age (U of Toronto Press, 1990)
 Semple, Neil. Lord's Dominion: The History of Canadian Methodism (McGill-Queen's Press-MQUP, 1996)
 Webster, Thomas. History of the Methodist Episcopal Church in Canada  (1870) online
 Wilson, Robert S. "Patterns of Canadian Baptist Life in the Twentieth Century," Baptist History & Heritage (2001) 36# 1/2, pp 27–60. Covers the educational, social, political, missionary, and theological trends; notes that the years 1953–2000 were marked by the union of different Baptist groups.

Women, gender, family

Historiography and guides to the scholarly literature

 
 Berger, Carl. Writing Canadian History: Aspects of English Canadian Historical Writing since 1900 (2nd ed. 1986), 364pp evaluates the work of most of the leading 20th century historians of Canada.
 Berger, Carl, ed. Contemporary Approaches to Canadian Writing (1987)
 
 
 Buckner, Phillip  and John G. Reid, eds. Remembering 1759: The Conquest of Canada in Historical Memory (U of Toronto Press, 2012)
 Careless, J. M. S. "Canadian Nationalism — Immature or Obsolete?" Report of the Annual Meeting of the Canadian Historical Association / Rapports annuels de la Société historique du Canada (1954) 33#1 pp: 12–19. online
 
  Edwards, Justin D.l  and Douglas Ivison. Downtown Canada: Writing Canadian Cities (2005)
 Fulford, Robert, David Godfrey, and Abraham Rotstein. Read Canadian: a book about Canadian books (1972) 275pp; topical chapters that comment on the best historical and current studies
 Gagnon, Serge.  Quebec and its Historians: 1840 to 1920 (English ed. 1982; French ed. 1978)
 Gagnon, Serge. Quebec and its Historians: The Twentieth Century (English ed. 1985)
 Glassford, Larry A. "The Evolution of 'New Political History' in English-Canadian Historiography: From Cliometrics to Cliodiversity." American Review of Canadian Studies. 32#3 (2002).
 
 Granatstein, J. L. and Paul Stevens, eds. A Reader's Guide to Canadian History: Confederation to the Present (1982)
 
 
 
 
 Muise, D. A. ed., A Reader's Guide to Canadian History: i, Beginnings to Confederation (1982); historiography
 Granatstein and Stevens, eds. A Reader's Guide to Canadian History: Confederation to the Present v2 (1982); historiography
 
 
 Taylor, M. Brook,  ed. Canadian History: A Reader's Guide. Vol. 1. Doug Owram, ed. Canadian History: A Reader's Guide. Vol. 2. Toronto: 1994. historiography
 Rudin, Ronald.  Making History in Twentieth Century Quebec (1997)
 Schultz, John. ed. Writing About Canada: A Handbook for Modern Canadian History (1990), chapters by experts on  politics, economics, ideas, regions, agriculture, business, labor, women, ethnicity and war.
 Strong-Boag, Veronica, Mona Gleason, and Adele Perry. Rethinking Canada: The Promise of Women's History (2003)
 
 Warkentin, John, ed. So Vast and Various: Interpreting Canada's Regions in the Nineteenth and Twentieth Centuries (2010); looks at 150 years of writings about Canada's regions.
 Wright, Donald. The Professionalization of History in English Canada (2005) 280pp

Primary sources
 Canadian Studies: A Guide to the Sources
 The CanText text library  contains a library of documents divided by time period.
 Canada: Literature and History 347 e-books
 Blackwell, John D. "Canadian Studies: A Core Collection," CHOICE: Current Reviews for Academic Libraries 35 (September 1997): 71-84,
 Browne, G. P., ed. Documents on the Confederation of British North America (1969).
 ; 707pp
 Morris, Alexander. 1880. The Treaties of Canada with the Indians of Manitoba and the North-West Territories: including the negotiations on which they were based, and other information relating thereto. Belfords, Clarke, and Co. Reprint: Prospero Books, Toronto, 2000.
 Pickersgill, J.W.,  and Donald F. Forster, The Mackenzie King Record. 4 vols. Vol. 1: 1939–1944 and Vol. 2: 1944–1945 (University of Toronto Press, 1960); and Vol. 3: 1945–1946 and Vol. 4: 1946–1947(University of Toronto Press, 1970). from King's diary
 485pp; short excerpts from primary sources covering 200 major topics
 Riddell, Walter A. ed; Documents on Canadian Foreign Policy, 1917–1939 (Oxford University Press, 1962) 806pp
 Talman, James J. ed; Basic Documents in Canadian History (1959)
 Thorner, Thomas, and Thor Frohn-Nielsen, eds. "A Few Acres of Snow": Documents in Pre-Confederation Canadian History, and "A Country Nourished on Self-Doubt": Documents on Post-Confederation Canadian History (3rd ed. (2010).

Historical statistics
 Statistics Canada. Historical Statistics of Canada. 2d ed., Ottawa: Statistics Canada, 1983.
 Canada Year Book (CYB) annual 1867–1967
 Cantril, Hadley and Mildred Strunk, eds. Public Opinion, 1935–1946  (1951), massive compilation of many public opinion polls from Canada and USA

See also

 Historiography of Canada
 Bibliography of Canada
 Outline of Canada#Bibliographies
 Bibliography of Canadian military history
 List of books about the War of 1812
 List of conflicts in Canada
 Bibliography of Canadian provinces and territories
 Bibliography of science and technology in Canada
 Bibliography of Nova Scotia
 Bibliography of Saskatchewan history
 Bibliography of Alberta history
 Bibliography of British Columbia
 Bibliography of the 1837-1838 insurrections in Lower Canada
 Lists of books
 List of bibliographies
 List of books about prime ministers of Canada

References

External links
 Events of National Historic Significance
 National Historic Sites of Canada
 Canadiana: The National Bibliography of Canada
 CBC Archives - Canadian Broadcasting Corporation
 Canadian History & Knowledge – Association for Canadian Studies

 
History
Canada
Historiography of the British Empire